Foveolar cells or surface mucous cells are mucus-producing cells which cover the inside of the stomach, protecting it from the corrosive nature of gastric acid. These cells line the gastric mucosa (mucous neck cells are found in the necks of the gastric pits). The mucus-secreting cells of the stomach can be distinguished histologically from the intestinal goblet cells, another type of mucus-secreting cell.

Structure

The gastric mucosa that lines the inner wall of the stomach has a set of microscopic features called gastric glands which, depending on the location within the stomach, secrete different substances into the lumen of the organ. The openings of these glands into the stomach are called gastric pits which foveolar cells line in order to provide a protective alkaline secretion against the corrosive gastric acid.

Microanatomy

Foveolar cells line the surface of the stomach, the gastric pits, and the top part of gastric glands: the neck. They constitute a simple columnar epithelium, as they form a single layer of cells and are taller than their width. Depending on their location, foveolar cells can be divided in two groups: surface mucous cells, which line the surface and the gastric pits; and mucous neck cells, which are a part of the neck of gastric glands along parietal cells.

Surface mucous cells have large quantities of mucin granules in their apical (top) surface and project short microvilli into the lumen of the stomach. Mucins are large glycoproteins that give the mucus its gel-like properties. As mucins are lost during routine histology preparation, they stain pale, but if preserved correctly the cells stain strongly with special techniques like PAS or toluidine blue, the last representing the anionic nature of foveolar cell secretions. Below the mucin granules, surface mucous cells have a Golgi apparatus, the nucleus, and small amounts of rough endoplasmic reticulum. Mucous neck cells are located within gastric glands, interspersed between parietal cells. These are shorter than their surface counterpart and contain lesser quantities of mucin granules in their apical surface.

Function

The mucus produced by these cells is extremely important, as it prevents the stomach from digesting itself. Parietal cells produce potent hydrochloric acid, which damages cells. Gastric chief cells produce pepsinogen, which is activated by the acid to form pepsin. Pepsin is a protease that can digest and damage stomach cells. To prevent these disastrous effects, mucus and bicarbonate ions (HCO3−) are secreted by the foveolar cells.

The mucus allows the acid at pH above 4 to penetrate lining, but below pH 4 (i.e. when acid is more concentrated) the acid cannot penetrate the mucus. This is called viscous fingering. Thus the foveolar cells can pump out a lot of acid, but acid once in the lumen of the stomach is prevented from returning.

See also 
List of human cell types derived from the germ layers

Notes

References

External links
  - "Digestive System: Alimentary Canal: fundic stomach, gastric glands, base"
  - see slide #41

Mucus secreting cells
Human cells
Stomach